Jeff Dahn (born in 1957 in the United States and emigrated to Nova Scotia, Canada in 1970) is a Professor in the Department of Physics & Atmospheric Science and the Department of Chemistry at Dalhousie University. He is recognized as one of the pioneering developers of the lithium-ion battery that is now used worldwide in laptop computers, cell-phones, cars and many other mobile devices.

Education
Dahn obtained his B.Sc. in Physics from Dalhousie University in 1978 and his Ph.D. from the University of British Columbia in 1982.

Career
Following his PhD, Dahn did research at the National Research Council of Canada from 1982 until 1985, before working at E-One Moli Energy until 1990. At that time, he took up a faculty position in the Physics Department at Simon Fraser University. Six years later, in 1996, Dahn returned to Dalhousie University as a professor in the Department of Physics & Atmospheric Science and began to focus his research on lithium-ion batteries.

From the time that he started doing research, Dahn has worked closely with industry. During his years at Simon Fraser University he worked with E-One Moli Energy. Upon moving to Dalhousie in 1996, Dahn became the NSERC/3M Canada Industrial Research Chair in Materials for Advanced Batteries, a position that he was to hold for the next 20 years. In June 2016, Dahn began a 5-year research partnership with Tesla Motors, in order to improve the energy density and lifetime of lithium-ion batteries, along with reducing their cost. He is also Chief Scientific Advisor to NOVONIX (NASDAQ:NVX)-a battery materials and technology company based in Canada and the United States.

Awards and honors
Dahn has received numerous awards including: International Battery Materials Association (IBA) Research Award (1995); Herzberg Medal, Canadian Association of Physicists (1996); ECS Battery Division Research Award (1996); Fellow of the Royal Society of Canada (2001);  Medal for Excellence in Teaching (2009) from the Canadian Association of Physicists, The Rio-Tinto Alcan Award from the Canadian Institute of Chemistry (2010), the ECS Battery Division Technology Award (2011) the Yeager award from the International Battery Materials Association (2016), the Inaugural Governor General's Innovation Award (2016) and the Gerhard Herzberg Canada Gold Medal for Science and Engineering (2017).

References

External links
Google Scholar profile

Canadian physicists
1957 births
Living people